Gil "Kabarangay" Abesamis Acosta Jr. is a Filipino politician, lawyer and psychologist who served as a member of the Philippine House of Representatives representing the 3rd District of Palawan from 2019 to 2022.

Political career

House of Representatives (2019 - 2022) 
Acosta was elected representative of Palawan's 3rd district in 2019, succeeding his father Gil P. Acosta. He is one of the 70 lawmakers who voted to reject the franchise of ABS-CBN.

He ran for re-election 2022 but lost to former Puerto Princesa Mayor Edward Hagedorn.

References

External links 
 Official Facebook page

Living people
Members of the House of Representatives of the Philippines from Palawan
Year of birth missing (living people)